Troodos (sometimes spelled Troödos;) is the largest mountain range in Cyprus, located in roughly the center of the island.

The Troodos mountain range stretches across most of the western side of Cyprus. There are many mountain resorts, Byzantine monasteries, and churches on mountain peaks, and nestling in its valleys and mountains are villages clinging to terraced hills. The area has been known since antiquity for its mines, which for centuries supplied copper to the entire Mediterranean. In the Byzantine period it became a centre of Byzantine art, as churches and monasteries were built in the mountains, away from the threatened coastline. The mountains are also home to RAF Troodos, a listening post for the NSA and GCHQ.

The name Troodos probably comes from one of two sources: either  +  ( + ), referring to the three roads that lead to the mountain, or  +  +  ( +  + ), meaning the mountains of Adonis.

Geology of Troodos

The Troodos mountains are known worldwide for their geology and the presence of an undisturbed ophiolite sequence, the Troodos Ophiolite. These mountains slowly rose from the sea due to the collision of the African and European tectonic plates, a process that eventually formed the island of Cyprus. The slowing and near-cessation of this process left the rock formations nearly intact, while subsequent erosion uncovered the magma chamber underneath the mountain, allowing a viewing of intact rocks and petrified pillow lava formed millions of years ago, an excellent example of ophiolite stratigraphy. The observations of the Troodos ophiolite by Ian Graham Gass and co-workers was one of the key points that led to the theory of sea floor spreading.

Climate

Churches

The region is known for its many Byzantine churches and monasteries, richly decorated with murals, of which the Kykkos monastery is the richest and most famous. Nine churches and one monastery in Troodos together form a World Heritage Site, originally inscribed on the World Heritage List by UNESCO in 1985. The nine Byzantine churches are:
 Stavros tou Agiasmati
 Panagia tou Araka
 Timiou Stavrou at Pelendri
 Agios Nikolaos tis Stegis
 Panagia Podithou
 Assinou
 Agios Ioannis Lampadistis at Kalopanagiotis
 Panagia tou Moutoula
 Archangel Michael at Pedoulas
 Transfiguration of the Saviour Palaichori

Villages of Troodos (selection)

 Platres
 Galata
 Evrychou
 Kakopetria
 Louvaras
 Palaichori Oreinis
 Kourdali
 Pelendri
 Kalopanagiotis
 Moutoullas
 Pachna
 Dora
 Malia
 Kyperounta
 Farmakas
 Prastio
 Arsos
 Pedoulas
 Omodos
 Phini
 Kouka
 Fikardou
 Koilani
 Agros
 Prodromos
 Marathassa Valley
 Vasa Koilaniou
 Lania
 Spilia

Gallery

See also
 Geography of Cyprus

References

External links
 Official Website of Troodos Region, by the Cyprus Tourism Organisation
 Troodos (General Area) Museums
 Panoramic virtual tour of the Troodos Mountains
 Kypros Net article on Troodos
 Awarded "EDEN – European Destinations of Excellence" non traditional tourist destination 2007

Cyprus Mediterranean forests
Mountain ranges of Cyprus
Troodos Mountains
Mountains associated with Byzantine monasticism